Rookies is a reality television series which aired on the A&E television network. The show follows the training periods of rookie police officers in Jefferson Parish, Louisiana and Tampa, Florida as they train on the beat with their Field Training Officers (FTO) for their first 12 weeks. The episodes include rookie mistakes, training sessions by veteran officers, and final evaluations. Rookies debuted on October 21, 2008 and ended in May 2009.

Overview
This show is about fresh-faced police recruits learning and practicing law enforcement while on the job.

Cast
The cast consisted of Dennis Cooper, Amy Hess, Tommie Tolbert, Henry Conravey, Mark Monson, Hugh Herndon, Elton Johnson, April Levine, and Rebecca Webster.

Reception
Common Sense Media gave the show 3 out of 5 stars.

References

External links

2008 American television series debuts
A&E (TV network) original programming
2000s American reality television series
2009 American television series endings
English-language television shows
Television shows set in Louisiana
Television shows set in Tampa, Florida
Television series by Tiger Aspect Productions